Mina Klabin Warchavchik (1896 - 1969) was a Brazilian landscape architect known for designing modern and abstract gardens composed of plants native to Southern Brazil. She created gardens surrounding homes designed by her husband, Brazilian modernist architect Gregori Warchavchik.

Biography

Family history 
Mina Klabin was the eldest daughter of Bertha Obstrand and Maurício Freeman Klabin, a Lithuanian-Jewish immigrant who fled the Russian Empire. Her father had purchased property in Lithuania despite a decree from Czar Alexander III barring Jews from owning any land. After being outed to the authorities he and other Jewish refugees made a long journey on foot to one of the Baltic ports, where he escaped to Britain. He later left for Brazil in search of better opportunities. Soon after his arrival in São Paulo, Freeman Klabin began working  in a book making factory which he would later come to own. After reaching financial stability, Klabin was able to bring his then fiancé Bertha Obstrand and the rest of his family to join him in São Paulo. The Klabins would become a prominent São Paulo family, founding the stationary and supply company Klabin Irmãos & Cia.

Childhood 

At an early age, Mina Klabin displayed talents for learning languages, music and painting.

Landscape design 
Klabin is credited with celebrating native tropical species such as agaves, mandacarus and cacti. She created landscapes alongside the eight São Paulo homes designed by her husband, which include Casa Modernista, Rua Itápolis, São Paulo and their own home Casa da Rua Santa Cruz. She has been credited with helping to establish the cactus as an icon of modern Brazilian design.

Other achievements 
Mina Klabin Warchavchik and Gregori Warchavchik were among the early supporters of the São Paulo municipal theater.

References

1896 births
Brazilian people of Lithuanian descent
Women landscape architects
Brazilian landscape architects
1969 deaths
Lafer-Klabin family